75 Ceti is a single star in the equatorial constellation of Cetus with at least one planet. It is visible to the naked eye as a dim, orange-hued star with an apparent visual magnitude of +5.36. The star is located 271 light years distant from the Sun, based on parallax, but is drifting closer with a radial velocity of −6 km/s.

Consequently, 75 Ceti itself is known as the Tenth Star of Circular Celestial Granary.

It is a red clump giant, which indicates it is on the horizontal branch and is generating energy through helium fusion at the core. The star is 1.4 billion years old with 1.9 times the Sun's mass. It is radiating 56 times the luminosity of the Sun from its swollen photosphere at an effective temperature of 4,846 K.

The planetary companion was discovered by Doppler measurements at the Okayama Astrophysical Observatory, and announced in 2012. The planet's discoverers consider the planet, designated 75 Ceti b, to be "typical" of gas giants. Note that (like many recorded planets) b takes in much more insolation than does Jupiter and, indeed, Earth.

 

There may be additional periodic factors in the data, corresponding to m sin i of around
If these additional companions are confirmed, they are more irradiated than Earth as well.

References

K-type giants
Horizontal-branch stars
Planetary systems with one confirmed planet

Ceti, 75
Cetus (constellation)
Durchmusterung objects
Ceti, 75
011791
015779
0739
TIC objects